Murder in Texas is a 1981 television film starring Katharine Ross, Sam Elliott, Farrah Fawcett, and Andy Griffith. The film was directed by William Hale, and was based on a true story; that was written for the TV screen by John McGreevey.  It first aired on television in two parts on Sunday and Monday May 3–4, 1981.

Plot
Based on the true story of the death of Joan Robinson Hill, this film tells of a plastic surgeon who was suspected of causing the death of his first wife, the daughter of a wealthy member of Houston society.  The circumstances of her death - which was never solved - are clouded by a suspiciously hasty embalming and a hurried burial. The doctor then marries his mistress. In spite of two autopsies showing that his daughter died of natural causes, Ash Robinson, convinced that his daughter was murdered, sets out single-handedly to find out the true cause of her death, determined to see that the doctor is punished.

Cast
 Katharine Ross as Ann Kurth Hill
 Sam Elliott as Dr. John Hill
 Farrah Fawcett as Joan Robinson Hill
 Andy Griffith as Ash Robinson 
 G. W. Bailey as Richard "Racehorse" Haynes 
 Barry Corbin as Dist. Atty. McMasters 
 Pamela Myers as Mary 
 Craig T. Nelson as Jack Ramsey 
 Royce Wallace as Wilma 
 Dimitra Arliss as Gina Meier 
 Jude Farese as Casselli 
 Philip Sterling as Dr. Helpern 
 Vernon Weddle as Dr. Joe 
 Lesley Woods as Reah Robinson
 Parley Baer as Ann's attorney

Reception
Murder in Texas was nominated for a 1982 Golden Globe Award for Best Mini-Series or Motion Picture Made for TV. In addition, Andy Griffith received his only Emmy nomination for his portrayal of Ash Robinson.

The movie was highly ranked in the Nielsen ratings.  Part I was the fifth-most popular show for the week ending May 3, and Part II was the most popular show of the following week.

References

External links

1981 films
1981 television films
1981 drama films
American television films
Films scored by Leonard Rosenman
Films set in Houston
Films shot in Houston
Films shot in Texas
Crime films based on actual events
Poisoning in film
Films directed by William Hale (director)
1980s English-language films